Joseph Albert Lintner (8 February 1822 in Schoharie, New York – 5 May 1898 in Rome) was an American entomologist. He held the position of State Entomologist from 1881 following the creation of this post by the federal government. He served until 1898. Lintner wrote 900 scientific papers and 13 of the Report on the injurious and other insects of the State of New York on crop pests and injurious  insects associated with agriculture. His collection is in the New York State Museum.

References

Anonym 1898 [Lintner, J. A.]  Entomologist's Monthly Magazine (3) 34 
Anonym 1898: [Lintner, J. A.]  Entomologist 31 174-175 
Howard, L. O. 1930 History of applied Entomology (Somewhat Anecdotal Smiths. Miscell. Coll. 84 X+1-564. 
Mallis, A. 1971 American Entomologists. Rutgers Univ. Press New Brunswick  52–54, Portrait. 
Osborn, H. 1937  Fragments of Entomological History Including Some Personal Recollections of Men and Events. Columbus, Ohio, Published by the Author 1 1–394, 47 Taf. nur Portr. (Taf. 14)

1822 births
1898 deaths
American entomologists
People from Schoharie, New York
Scientists from New York (state)